Karanović is a Serbian surname, derived from the masculine given name Karan, either derived from Turkish kara (black) or a hypocoristic of Karanfil. The name Karan is present in Serbian society from the Late Middle Ages. It is found in Serbia, Bosnia and Herzegovina, and Dalmatia (borne by Serbs in Čučevo and Kistanje). The toponym Karanovići is found as hamlet in Ovčinja. It may refer to:

Goran Karanovic, Swiss footballer
Mirjana Karanović, Serbian actress
Nevena Karanović, Serbian politician
Srđan Karanović, Serbian film director
Pavle Tvrtković or Karanović, Serbian Orthodox priest

See also
Karanovac (disambiguation), placename
Karanovci, placename

References

Sources

Serbian surnames